Hasan-e Aliabad (also Romanized as Ḩasan-e ‘Alīābād and Ḩasan ‘Alīābād; also known as Ḩoseyn‘alīābād) is a village in Sang Bast Rural District, in the Central District of Fariman County, Razavi Khorasan Province, Iran. At the 2006 census, its population was 20, in 6 families.

References 

Populated places in Fariman County